The statue of Jaroslav Hašek is an outdoor monument and equestrian statue by Karel Nepraš and Karolína Neprašová, installed at Prokopovo náměstí in the Žižkov district of Prague, Czech Republic. The sculpture was installed in 2005, having been completed by Nepraš's daughter Karolína after his death. It is located in an area where Hašek lived during writing of his famous novel The Good Soldier Švejk.

See also

 2005 in art
 List of equestrian statues

References

External links
 

2005 establishments in the Czech Republic
2005 sculptures
Equestrian statues in the Czech Republic
Jaroslav Hašek
Monuments and memorials in Prague
Outdoor sculptures in Prague
Statues in Prague
Statues of writers
Žižkov
21st-century architecture in the Czech Republic